The 1929 Western Maryland Green Terror football team was an American football team that represented Western Maryland College (now known as McDaniel College) as an independent during the 1929 college football season. In its fourth season under head coach Dick Harlow, the team compiled a perfect 11–0 record and shut out eight of its eleven opponents.

The 1929 season preceded the era of the AP Poll, but Western Maryland was the only undefeated team to play an 11-game schedule. After the season the Associated Press wrote: "Western Maryland With 11 Straight Victories Leads the List. Fourteen teams remained unbeaten at the close of the football season, Western Maryland leading the major teams with eleven straight victories, according to The Associated Press."

Key players included Eugene "Stoney" Willis, Rip Engle, Charles Havens and Paul Bates. Western Maryland's 1929 season was part of a 27-game undefeated streak that started in 1928 and continued into 1931. Coach Harlow was later inducted into the College Football Hall of Fame.

Schedule

References

Western Maryland
McDaniel Green Terror football seasons
College football undefeated seasons
Western Maryland Green Terror football